This list of nicknamed non-dinosaur fossils is a list of non-dinosaurian fossil specimens given informal names or nicknames, in addition to their institutional catalogue numbers. It excludes informal appellations that are purely descriptive (e.g., "the Fighting Dinosaurs", "the Trachodon Mummy").

For a list of dinosaur fossil specimens, see List of dinosaur specimens with nicknames.

Synapsids

Mammals

Atlantogenata

Carnivorans

Primates

Ungulates

Marsupials

Pelycosaurs

Reptiles

Lepidosauria

Pseudosuchians

Pterosauria

Sauropterygia

Misc Reptiles

Misc. Tetrapods

Fish

Arthropods

Mollusks

See also 
 Non-dinosaur specimens
 Non-dinosaur specimens
 Non-dinosaur specimens

References 

Nicknames,non-dinosaur